David Edmond Neuberger, Baron Neuberger of Abbotsbury   (born 10 January 1948) is an English judge. He served as President of the Supreme Court of the United Kingdom from 2012 to 2017. He was a Lord of Appeal in Ordinary until the House of Lords' judicial functions were transferred to the new Supreme Court in 2009, at which point he became Master of the Rolls, the second most senior judge in England and Wales. Neuberger was appointed to the Supreme Court, as its President, in 2012. He now serves as a Non-Permanent Judge of the Hong Kong Court of Final Appeal and the Chair of the High-Level Panel of Legal Experts on Media Freedom.

Early life
Neuberger was born on 10 January 1948, the son of Albert Neuberger, Professor of Chemical Pathology at St Mary's Hospital, University of London, and his wife, Lilian. His uncle was the noted rabbi Herman N. Neuberger. All three of his brothers are or were professors: James Neuberger is Professor of Medicine at the University of Birmingham, Michael Neuberger was Professor of Molecular Immunology at the University of Cambridge, while Anthony Neuberger is Professor in Finance at Warwick Business School, University of Warwick.

He was educated first at The Hall School, Hampstead, then Westminster School, and studied chemistry at Christ Church, Oxford.

Career
After graduation, Neuberger worked at the merchant bank, N M Rothschild & Sons, from 1970–73. Neuberger was called to the Bar at Lincoln's Inn in 1974, where he became a Bencher in 1993. He became a Queen's Counsel in 1987. He was a Recorder from 1990 to 1 October 1996, when he was appointed a High Court Judge in the Chancery Division and received the customary knighthood.

In 2001, he was made Supervisory Chancery Judge of Midland, Wales and Chester, and of the Western Circuits, a post he held until 12 January 2004, when he was appointed a Lord Justice of Appeal and a member of the Privy Council.

Since 2005, he has been co-chair (with Richard Susskind) of ITAC (Lord Chancellor's Information Technology and Courts Committee).

On 11 January 2007, he succeeded Lord Nicholls of Birkenhead as a Lord of Appeal in Ordinary and was made a life peer as Baron Neuberger of Abbotsbury, of Abbotsbury in the County of Dorset, and introduced in the House of Lords on 15 January 2007 between Lord Bingham of Cornhill and his sister-in-law, Baroness Neuberger.

His rise to the Court of Appeal and then to the House of Lords is one of the quickest in recent times. Although Lord Devlin was, at 55, even younger on his own appointment to the House of Lords in 1960, Neuberger was the youngest sitting Law Lord.

It was announced on 23 July 2009 that he would be appointed the next Master of the Rolls, succeeding Lord Clarke of Stone-cum-Ebony, who became one of the inaugural Justices of the Supreme Court on the retirement of Lord Scott of Foscote. This appointment took effect on 1 October 2009.

Between 2006 and 2007, he led an investigation for the Bar Council into widening access to the Bar. He also served on the Panel on Fair Access to the Professions, led by former Health Secretary Alan Milburn, which reported in July 2009. Other Panel members included Trevor Phillips, head of the Commission for Equalities and Human Rights, Michael Grade, Chairman of ITV, and Martin Rees, Astronomer Royal.

In May 2010, Neuberger gave an ex tempore dissenting judgment that the trade union Unite had not complied with ballot rules under trade union legislation.

In July 2010 Neuberger ruled that peace protesters in Parliament Square who had camped out in Democracy Village should be evicted after the protesters lost an appeal.

In May 2011, while commenting on super injunctions, he said that social media sites like Twitter were "totally out of control" and society should consider ways to bring such websites under control.

In July 2012, it was announced that Neuberger would succeed Lord Phillips of Worth Matravers as President of the Supreme Court, which post he took up on 1 October 2012.

In February 2017, it was announced that Neuberger would retire "in the Summer" from his role in the Supreme Court.

He now sits as a voting cross-bench member of the House of Lords and is the Chair of the High-Level Panel of Legal Experts on Media Freedom, an independent body convened at the request of the UK and Canadian governments.

Selected cases
Akici v L R Butlin Ltd [2006] WLR 601
In re Osiris Insurance Ltd [1991] 1 BCLC 182
Re Park House Properties [1997] 2 BCLC 530
Yuen v McDonald's Corp (Chancery Division, 27 November 2001) The Daily Telegraph, 6 December 2001
Re T&D Industries plc [2000] BCC 956
Krasner v McMath [2005]
St Helen's MBC v Derbyshire [2007] UKHL 16, [2007] ICR 841
Stack v Dowden [2007] 2 AC 432, Lord Neuberger gave a powerful dissenting speech in which he warned the majority of violating "principle", departing from established precedence and complicating judicial tasks.
Ladele v London Borough of Islington [2009] 
British Airways plc v Unite the Union [2010] EWCA Civ
Manchester City Council v Pinnock [2010] UKSC 45, Lord Neuberger MR sitting in the Supreme Court along with 8 other Justices giving the only judgment,
The Public Prosecution Service v William Elliott and Robert McKee [2013] UKSC 32
FHR European Ventures LLP v Cedar Capital Partners LLC [2014] UKSC 45
Jetivia SA v Bilta (UK) Limited (in liquidation) [2015] UKSC 23
Marks and Spencer plc v BNP Paribas Securities Services Trust Company (Jersey) Ltd [2015] UKSC 72

Awards and honours
He was elected an Honorary Fellow of the Royal Society in 2017.

In 2018, Neuberger was awarded the Gold Bauhinia Star by the Chief Executive of Hong Kong.

Significant lectures
On 24 February 2014, Neuberger delivered at Cambridge University the Freshfields annual lecture, which he entitled "The British and Europe".

Personal life

In 1976, Neuberger married Angela Holdsworth, the TV producer and writer. They have three children, Jessica, Nicholas and Max, who are all solicitors. Neuberger's sister-in-law, through his brother Anthony Neuberger, is Julia Neuberger, Baroness Neuberger, Senior Rabbi of the West London Synagogue.

Neuberger was Chairman of the Schizophrenia Trust from 2003 to 2013, when it merged with and was subsumed by Mental Health Research UK: he is now a Trustee of MHRUK. He was a Governor of the University of the Arts London between 2000 and 2010. He was President of the British Records Association from 2009 to 2012, in his capacity as Master of the Rolls.

On 18 May 2020 he was appointed as Deputy President of The Academy of Experts due to replace Mark Saville, Baron Saville of Newdigate as President in late 2020.

References

Further reading
 

1948 births
Living people
People educated at The Hall School, Hampstead
People educated at Westminster School, London
Alumni of Christ Church, Oxford
20th-century English judges
English Jews
Neuberger of Abbotsbury 
Crossbench life peers
Members of the Privy Council of the United Kingdom
Chancery Division judges
Members of Lincoln's Inn
Members of the Judicial Committee of the Privy Council
Masters of the Rolls
Justices of the Court of Final Appeal (Hong Kong)
Hong Kong judges
Presidents of the Supreme Court of the United Kingdom
Knights Bachelor
David
English people of German-Jewish descent
Honorary Fellows of the Royal Society
N M Rothschild & Sons people
Judges of the Supreme Court of the United Kingdom
21st-century English judges